Collegiate School is a private coeducational day school located in Passaic, New Jersey, United States. Established in 1895, the school serves students in pre-kindergarten through twelfth grade. The school has an enrollment of about 160 students. The school has been accredited by the Middle States Association of Colleges and Schools Commission on Secondary Schools since 1974.

As of the 2017–18 school year, the school had an enrollment of 49 students (plus 5 in Pre-K) and 7 classroom teachers (on an FTE basis), for a student–teacher ratio of 6.3:1. The school's student body was 52.3% (23) Hispanic, 22.7% (10) White, 13.6% (6) Asian and 11.4% (5) Black.

The school aims to provide "a safe, individual oriented environment that stresses basic skills, positive attitudes, values and academic growth." Collegiate is a member of the New Jersey Association of Independent Schools.

Notable alumni
 Frances Goodrich (1890-1984), dramatist and screenwriter, best known for her collaborations with her partner and husband Albert Hackett.
 Carl Ruiz (1975-2019), restaurant owner and celebrity chef, best known as a judge on various cooking competition shows on the Food Network.

References

External links
Official site

1895 establishments in New Jersey
Educational institutions established in 1895
Middle States Commission on Secondary Schools
New Jersey Association of Independent Schools
Passaic, New Jersey
Private K-12 schools in New Jersey
Private high schools in Passaic County, New Jersey